Rolando Rubalcava (22 July 1923 – 15 October 1996) was a Mexican basketball player. He competed in the men's tournament at the 1952 Summer Olympics.

References

External links
 

1923 births
1996 deaths
Mexican men's basketball players
Olympic basketball players of Mexico
Basketball players at the 1952 Summer Olympics
Basketball players from Jalisco
Sportspeople from Guadalajara, Jalisco